Jonathan ("Jon") Peter Ridgeon (born 14 February 1967) is an English former athlete who competed mainly in the 110 metres hurdles and the 400 metres hurdles. In the 110m hurdles, he won the silver medal at the 1987 World Championships and the gold medal at the 1987 Universiade. He represented Great Britain at the 1988 Seoul Olympics and the 1996 Atlanta Olympics.

Biography 
Ridgeon was born in Bury St Edmunds, Suffolk. He won the 110 m hurdles at the European Junior Championship in 1985, ahead of his fellow British athlete Colin Jackson, who finished runner-up. Ridgeon then finished second to Jackson at the 1986 World Junior Championships. He represented England in the 110 metres hurdles event, at the 1986 Commonwealth Games in Edinburgh, Scotland.

Ridgeon won the 110 m hurdles gold medal at the 1987 Universiade (World University Games) in Zagreb.

At the 1987 World Championships in Rome, Ridgeon won a silver medal in the 110 m hurdles  (with Jackson taking the bronze medal). Ridgeon then finished in fifth place at the 1988 Olympic Games in Seoul (where Jackson came second). However Ridgeon and Jackson's rivalry was comparatively short-lived, as Ridgeon began to develop injuries that led to him missing out on most major events in the following years.

When Ridgeon returned to regular competition, he switched to the 400 metres hurdles, before his retiring from the sport.

Ridgeon was educated at Magdalene College, Cambridge. In 1998 he became a founding and managing partner of Fast Track, a sports marketing agency (the agency was sold in 2007). As well as working with Fast Track, Ridgeon has also been a TV commentator for the BBC and BSkyB since retiring as an athlete.

In 2018, Ridgeon was appointed chief executive officer of the International Association of Athletics Federations (IAAF).

Personal bests
 110m H - 13.29 (Zagreb, Croatia, 15 Jul 1987)
 400m H - 48.73 (Rieti, Italy, 6 Sep 1992)

Achievements

References

External links

1967 births
Living people
English male hurdlers
Athletes (track and field) at the 1988 Summer Olympics
Athletes (track and field) at the 1996 Summer Olympics
Olympic athletes of Great Britain
Alumni of Magdalene College, Cambridge
People from Burwell, Cambridgeshire
Sportspeople from Bury St Edmunds
Athletes (track and field) at the 1986 Commonwealth Games
Commonwealth Games competitors for England
World Athletics Championships medalists
World Athletics Championships athletes for Great Britain
Universiade medalists in athletics (track and field)
Universiade gold medalists for Great Britain
World Athletics Indoor Championships medalists
Medalists at the 1987 Summer Universiade